Telefishion is a television program in Hong Kong which was broadcast on ATV Home and ATV World and showed goldfish in a fish bowl live. It was also the first slow TV in Hong Kong.

History 
Telefishion was suggested by Kenneth Kwok Wai Kin(郭偉健), the CEO of Asia Television who was invited by Lim Por-yen(林百欣). Kwok thought that the competitor, the Television Broadcasts Limited's test pattern was not interesting, so he suggested showing a fishbowl with goldfishes in summertime and a stove in wintertime, to replace the test pattern when off-the-air and increase the advertising revenue of ATV. ATV decided to use the fishbowl with goldfish option and the stove option was not implemented due to safety issues.

The program first aired in 1993. In 2004, as the ATV station started broadcasting 24 hours a day, the program was cancelled, 25 April 2004 being the last-time it was aired in ATV World.

In February 2011, Telefishion was aired again for a short time, broadcast in the morning. However, this TV program was cancelled in May 2011.

External links

Hong Kong television shows
Asia Television original programming
1990s Hong Kong television series
2000s Hong Kong television series
2010s Hong Kong television series
1993 Hong Kong television series debuts
2004 Hong Kong television series endings
2011 Hong Kong television series debuts
2011 Hong Kong television series endings
Interstitial television shows
Slow television